Robin Welsh (20 October 1869 – 21 October 1934) was a Scottish sportsman who represented the Royal Caledonian Curling Club as a curler in the Winter Olympics, represented Scotland in tennis and played international rugby union for Scotland.

Rugby Union career

Amateur career

He played for Watsonians.

Provincial career

He played for Edinburgh District. He also played for Cities District.

International career

He was capped four times for Scotland between 1895 and 1896.

Referee career

He was an international referee. He refereed the England versus Ireland match in 1902; the Wales versus England match in 1903; and the Ireland versus England match in 1905.

He refereed in the Scottish Unofficial Championship.

Administrative career

He was President of the Scottish Rugby Union for the period 1925 to 1926.

Curling career

He was part of the Royal Caledonian Curling Club team which won the first Olympic Gold medal in curling at the inaugural Winter Olympics in Chamonix, France, in 1924.

See also
 Curling at the 1924 Winter Olympics

References

External links
 

1869 births
1934 deaths
Scottish male curlers
British male curlers
Olympic curlers of Great Britain
Olympic gold medallists for Great Britain
Olympic medalists in curling
Curlers at the 1924 Winter Olympics
Medalists at the 1924 Winter Olympics
Scottish Olympic medallists
Scottish rugby union players
Rugby union players from Edinburgh
Rugby union wings
Scotland international rugby union players
Curlers from Edinburgh
Scottish rugby union referees
Watsonians RFC players
Scottish male tennis players
British male tennis players
Scottish Unofficial Championship referees
Edinburgh District (rugby union) players
Cities District players
Presidents of the Scottish Rugby Union